Sir Alfred Lassam Goodson, 1st Baronet (17 May 1867 – 29 November 1940) was an English businessman and public servant.

Goodson was born in London, the son of a merchant. During the First World War he was president of both the Officers' Training Corps Selection Board and the Overseas Civilian Advisory Boards, General Headquarters, France. For these services he was knighted and then created a Baronet in the 1922 New Year Honours.

Footnotes

References
Obituary, The Times, 30 November 1940

1867 births
1940 deaths
Businesspeople from London
Knights Bachelor
Baronets in the Baronetage of the United Kingdom